Minstrelsy may refer to:

 The art of the medieval minstrel
 The 19th-century American minstrel show